Dr. Ali Tarab Ali (born July 20, 1947) is a Member of Parliament in the National Assembly of Tanzania and is the Shadow Minister for Health and Social Welfare. He received a Master's degree and Ph.D, both in biochemistry, from Kharkov State University in the Soviet Union (now Kharkiv University in Ukraine). Prior to being a member of Parliament, Ali was a biochemist within the Ministry of Health for Zanzibar and a lecturer at Muhimbili University College of Health Science.
He is also a lecturer for biochemistry at Hurbert kairuki memorial university (HKMU). His students includes Mtenga (Revised by Rx).

References

External links
 Parliament of Tanzania website

1947 births
Living people
Tanzanian educators
Members of the National Assembly (Tanzania)
Civic United Front politicians
National University of Kharkiv alumni